In 1949 the historian Arthur Keppel-Jones wrote Friends or Foes? A point of view and a programme for racial harmony in South Africa, which claimed that devolution into federalist states would promote harmonious relations between the different population groups of South Africa. Several decades later, in 1974, the Mahlabatini Declaration of Faith, which stressed the federal concept, was signed. In 1977 the Progressive Federal Party was started, which advocated power-sharing through a federal constitution. Today, the political parties which advocate a federal system for South Africa, are the Democratic Alliance (the successor of the Progressive Federal Party) and the Inkatha Freedom Party.

South Africa
Political movements in South Africa